The Paraguay men's national field hockey team represents Paraguay in international field hockey competitions, that are organized by the Pan American Hockey Federation (PAHF), the International Hockey Federation (FIH) and the International Olympic Committee (IOC), and is governed by the Asociación Paraguaya de Hockey.

Paraguay participates regularly in the South American Championships and had participated in the 1995 Pan American games in Mar del Plata, Argentina. The country opened its first synthetic hockey pitch in 2013.

Tournament History

Pan American Games

World League

*Draws include matches decided on a penalty shoot-out.

Pan American Challenge

South American Games

South American Championships

See also
Paraguay women's national field hockey team

References

Field hockey
Americas men's national field hockey teams
Men's sport in Paraguay
National team